The Armenia national under-17 football team is the national under-17 youth football team of Armenia. The team is based mostly on the young players from the league and competes every year to qualify for the FIFA U-17 World Cup and the UEFA European Under-17 Championship. The team played its first match in 1993, Armenia having, until 1992, been part of the USSR.

UEFA European Football Championship record

Under-16 format

Under-17 format

*Denotes draws include knockout matches decided on penalty kicks.

Current squad
 The following players were called up for the 2023 UEFA European Under-17 Championship qualification matches.
 Match dates: 20–26 October 2022
 Opposition: ,  and 
Caps and goals correct as of: 20 August 2022, after the match against

References

 Armenia - Under-17 at UEFA

External links
 Football Federation of Armenia

European national under-17 association football teams
Youth football in Armenia
Armenia national youth football team